Takht-e Olya (also Romanized as Takht-e ‘Olyā; also known as Takht and Takht-e Bālā) is a village in Charuymaq-e Sharqi Rural District, Shadian District, Charuymaq County, East Azerbaijan Province, Iran. At the 2006 census, its population was 96, in 18 families.

References 

Populated places in Charuymaq County